Pâ Solar Power Station, is a  solar power plant, under construction in Burkina Faso.

Location
The power station is located in the Pâ Department of Balé Province, near the town of Pâ, in southwestern Burkina Faso.

Overview
The power station has a capacity of 30 megawatts, which will be sold directly to Société Nationale d'électricité du Burkina Faso (SONABEL), the electric utility company of Burkina Faso, for integration in the national electricity grid. The developers of the power station have signed a 25-year power purchase agreement with SONABEL. After twenty-five years, ownership of he power station will revert to the Government of Burkina Faso.

The energy generated is sufficient to supply 150,000 customers.

Developers
The power station is under development by a consortium comprising Urbasolar, a French independent power producer, and Projet Production Solaire (PPS), a Burkinabe company, with minority shareholding in the special vehicle company that will own and develop the power station. For descriptive purposes, let us call that company Pâ Solar Consortium. Urbasolar is a subsidiary of Axpo Holding, a publicly traded Swiss energy conglomerate.

Costs and funding
The cost of construction is budgeted at €35.4 million. The Emerging Africa Infrastructure Fund (EAIF), a member of the Private Infrastructure Development Group (PIDG), has agreed to lend €29 million towards this project. Urbasolar is expected to provide the remaining €6.4 million in funding. The table below illustrates the sources of funding for this power station.

See also

List of power stations in Burkina Faso
Zagtouli Solar Power Station

References

External links
  EAIF loan of EUR 29m to back Urbasolar project in Burkina Faso As of 16 March 2021.	

Solar power stations in Burkina Faso
Energy infrastructure in Africa
Balé Province